Aces and Kings is a challenging and original solitaire game using two decks of playing cards, and was created by Thomas Warfield. The object of the game is to build 8 foundations down from King to Ace or up from Ace to King without regard to suit.  

Aces and Kings is a difficult game to win, with good players winning about 1 in 10 games.  It is a popular game that has been implemented on many websites and software programs that offer solitaire games.

Rules
Aces and Kings has eight foundations in total.  Four foundations start with an Ace and build up regardless of suit, e.g. A♥, 2♠, 3♦, 4♦.

The other four start with a King and build down regardless of suit, e.g. K♣, Q♥, J♠, 10♣

The games include two reserve piles of thirteen cards each that can only be played onto the foundations.  At the bottom left, there is a stock pile and a waste pile.  At the bottom right, there are the four tableau piles of one face-up card each.

Cards in the tableau can only be moved to the foundations; empty tableau spaces should be immediately filled with the top card from the stock pile.  If desired, the top card on a foundation pile can be transferred onto another one, as long as it is of compatible rank.  When the stock pile is empty, the game is over: if all of the foundations can be completed, the game has been won.

Variants

Other variations of Aces and Kings that were created by Thomas Warfield include Deuces and Queens, Acey and Kingsley, and Five Little Guys.

Racing Aces is a three deck version of the game, and Double Aces and Kings is a four deck version.

References

See also
 List of solitaires
 Glossary of solitaire

Double-deck patience card games
Mobile games
Reserved builders